American Trust and Savings Bank, also known as the Indiana Bank, is a historic bank building located at Sixth and Main Street in downtown Evansville, Indiana. It is designed by the architectural firm Harris & Shopbell and built in 1904.  It is a Beaux-Arts style limestone clad building. It was enlarged in 1913 when two additional floors were added. The bank closed on October 19, 1931, during the Great Depression.

It was listed on the National Register of Historic Places in 1982.

References

Bank buildings on the National Register of Historic Places in Indiana
Beaux-Arts architecture in Indiana
Commercial buildings completed in 1904
Buildings and structures in Evansville, Indiana
National Register of Historic Places in Evansville, Indiana